BFT is the abbreviation of:

 Battle Force Tank, an experimental tank in the video game Recoil
 Bayfront MRT station (MRT station abbreviation), a Mass Rapid Transit station in Singapore
 Beaufort scale, an empirical measure for describing wind speed
 Bluefin tuna, a common name used to refer to several species of tuna of the genus Thunnus
 Blue Force Tracking, a United States military term
 Blunt force trauma, trauma caused by sudden impact
 Brother Firetribe, a Finnish rock band
 Bureau français de Taipei (French Office in Taipei), de facto embassy of France in Taiwan
 Byzantine fault tolerance, a sub-field of error tolerance research
 Business and Financial Times, a newspaper in Ghana